Erard I, Count of Brienne (1060–1114) was Count of Brienne at the end of the 11th century.  He was the son of Gautier I of Brienne, count of Brienne, and his wife Eustachie of Tonnerre.

In 1097 he fought in the First Crusade.

In 1110 he married Alix of Roucy-Ramerupt, daughter of André de Montdidier-Roucy, seigneur de Ramerupt and son of Hilduin IV, Count of Montdidier. They had 3 children: 
 Gautier II of Brienne, count of Brienne and lord of Ramerupt. Father of Erard II.
 Guy of Brienne
 Félicité of Brienne, who married Simon I of Broyes, then in 1142 Geoffroy III, sire de Joinville.

1060 births
1120 deaths
Christians of the First Crusade
Counts of Brienne
House of Brienne